Patrice Jean Emmanuel Bouchet de Puyraimond is a French astrophysicist best known for his discovery of the Rings of Neptune, his infrared observations of supernova SN 1987A in the Large Magellanic Cloud, and the dust extinction law in the Small Magellanic Cloud.

References 

French astrophysicists
1953 births
Living people